Name That Tune is an American television game show that on NBC Radio.

Name That Tune may also refer to:
Name That Tune (British game show)
Name that Tune (Armenian game show)